William John Fiedler (January 10, 1910 - September 30, 1985) was an American soccer midfielder who played seven seasons in the American Soccer League.  He was on the U.S. national soccer team at both the 1934 FIFA World Cup and 1936 Summer Olympics. He was born in Philadelphia, Pennsylvania.

Professional career
Fiedler began his professional career in 1933 with the Philadelphia German-Americans in the American Soccer League, winning the 1935 league championship and the 1936 National Challenge Cup title.  In the National Cup series, Fiedler scored one of the Philadelphia goals in its 2-2 away tie with the St. Louis Shamrocks.  At some point, he moved to Philadelphia Passon.  He left the ASL in 1940.

National and Olympic team
He later played with the national team in an unofficial game with Scotland on June 9, 1935. A year later, Fiedler was part of the U.S. team at the 1936 Summer Olympics. The U.S. lost its only game of the tournament 1-0 to Italy. In that game, “Fiedler suffered torn ligaments in his knee when pushed roughly by Piccini, of the rival team. Weingartner (the referee) "put the thumb" on the Italian, ordering him from the game. Three times he tried to get Piccini to leave but finally gave up. A half dozen Italian players swarmed over the referee, pinning his hands to his sides and clamping hands over his mouth. The game was formally finished with Piccini still in the line up."

Fiedler died in September 1985 at the age of 75.

References

External links
 National Soccer Hall of Fame eligibility bio

1910 births
1985 deaths
American soccer players
Soccer players from Philadelphia
American Soccer League (1933–1983) players
United States men's international soccer players
1934 FIFA World Cup players
Footballers at the 1936 Summer Olympics
Olympic soccer players of the United States
Uhrik Truckers players
Association football midfielders